Hithi Nimun is a 2001 Maldivian drama film directed by Ali Shameel. Produced by Aslam Rasheed under Slam Studio, the film stars Mohamed Shavin, Mariyam Nisha, Mohamed Afrah and Sheereen Abdul Wahid in pivotal roles.

Premise
Junaid Ahmed (Mohamed Shavin), Shakeel (Hassan Afeef) and Nazima (Mariyam Nisha) are school graduates. Shakeel who is deeply in love with Nazima failed to propose to her when she discovers that Nazima is in a romantic relationship with Junaid. In order to attain higher studies and pursue a successful career, Junaid relocates to Male' where he works as the servant in the house with Khalid (Hassan Afeef) and his wife, Fareedha (Neena Saleem). While Khalid and Fareedha were abroad, Junaid meets Raniya (Sheereen Abdul Wahid) in a deliberate accident and shows off his fake status, impressing Raniya and her mother (Arifa Ibrahim). Meanwhile, Junaid receives a letter from Nazima informing about her pregnancy while requesting him to marry her urgently to conceal the truth from spreading.

Cast 
 Mohamed Shavin as Junaid Ahmed
 Mariyam Nisha as Nazima
 Sheereen Abdul Wahid as Raniya
 Mohamed Afrah as Shakeel
 Hassan Afeef as Khalid
 Neena Saleem as Fareedha
 Arifa Ibrahim as Raniya's mother 
 Chilhiya Moosa Manik as Katheeb
 Ibrahim Shakir as Fareedha's father
 Ali Shameel as Ahmed

Soundtrack

References

2001 films
Maldivian drama films
2001 drama films
Dhivehi-language films